The 1977–78 DFB-Pokal was the 35th season of the annual German football cup competition. It began on 29 July 1977 and ended on 15 April 1978. 128 teams competed in the tournament of seven rounds. In the final FC Köln defeated Fortuna Düsseldorf 2–0, thus defending their title from the last season.

Mode
The tournament consisted of seven single elimination rounds. In case a game ended with a draw 30 minutes of extra time were played. If the score was still level the game was replayed with 30 minutes of extra time in case of another draw. If still no winner could be determined, a penalty shootout decided which team advanced to the next round.

For the first time the final was not to be replayed in case of a draw after 120 minutes. In that case a penalty shootout would decide the winner of the DFB-Pokal.

Matches

First round

* Eggenstein objected formally against the result. A DFB-jury annulled the game and decided to hold a replay after Horner TV had already played their second round match against 1860 Munich. As Eggenstein won the replay the match Munich vs. Horner TV was also annulled and Munich had to play against Eggenstein.

Replays

Second round

* Horner TV's first round match was annulled and replayed. As Horner TV lost the replay against Eggenstein, Eggenstein advanced to the second round and played against Munich.

Replays

Third round

Round of 16

Replays

Quarter-finals

Replay

Semi-finals

Final

References

External links
 Official site of the DFB 
 Kicker.de 
 1977–78 results at Fussballdaten.de 
 1977–78 results at Weltfussball.de 

1977-78
1977–78 in German football cups